Anthon Grimsmo (born 5 July 1968) is a Norwegian curler and Olympic medalist. He received a bronze medal at the 1998 Winter Olympics in Nagano.

Anthon Grimsmo was skip for the bronze-winning team at the 1987 World Junior Curling Championships in Victoria.

References

External links
 

1968 births
Living people
Norwegian male curlers
Olympic curlers of Norway
Curlers at the 1998 Winter Olympics
Olympic bronze medalists for Norway
Olympic medalists in curling
Medalists at the 1998 Winter Olympics
20th-century Norwegian people